Vice-Admiral Sir Peter Maxwell Compston  (12 September 1915 – 20 August 2000) was a Royal Navy officer who became Deputy Supreme Allied Commander Atlantic.

Naval career
Educated at the Epsom College, Compston joined the Royal Air Force in 1936 and transferred to the Royal Navy in 1937. He served in World War II with 810 Naval Air Squadron and then 700 Naval Air Squadron. He was appointed Commanding Officer of the frigate HMS Orwell in 1955, naval attaché in Paris in 1960 and Commanding Officer of the aircraft carrier  in 1962. Victorious was under Compston's command during service in the Indonesia–Malaysia confrontation. He went on to be naval attaché in Washington D. C. in 1965, Flag Officer Flotillas Western Fleet in 1967 and Deputy Supreme Allied Commander Atlantic in 1968. He retired in 1970.

Family
In 1939 he married Valerie Marjorie Bocquet; they had one son and one daughter. Following the dissolution of his first marriage, he married Angela Brickwood in 1954.

References

1915 births
2000 deaths
People educated at Epsom College
Knights Commander of the Order of the Bath
Royal Navy vice admirals
Royal Navy officers of World War II